Larson Creek is a stream in the U.S. state of Oregon. It is a tributary to the Rogue River.

Larson Creek was named in 1902 after John A. Larson, a pioneer citizen.

References

Rivers of Oregon
Rivers of Jackson County, Oregon